Balyand is a village in the Jabrayil Rayon of Azerbaijan.

The Azerbaijan Ministry of Defense published a video of the village on December 22, 2020, confirming Azerbaijani rule over the village after its control by ethnic Armenian forces from April 1993 to the 2020 Nagorno-Karabakh war.

Notable natives 
 
 Akif Akbarov — So-called "National Hero of Azerbaijan".

References 

Populated places in Jabrayil District